Merindang Ke Bintang is the debut studio album by Malaysian rock band from Sarawak, the Masterpiece. It was released in 2009 through Masterjam Studio and re-released on Panggau Buluh Pengerindu Records in 2010. The album is the band's most popular album, receiving the Album of the Year award at the 2010 Dayak Music Awards in Kuching, Sarawak.

Track listing

Credits
Masterpiece
 Depha Masterpiece – vocals, songwriter
 Kennedy Edwin – guitars, vocals, backing vocals
 Willy Edwin – guitars, keyboards
 Watt Marcus – bass guitar
 Harold Vincent – drums
Guest musicians
 Daniel Ading – guitar outro on "Malam-Malam"
Production
 Recorded at Masterjam Studio and Fish Farm Record, Sarawak, Malaysia
 First released by Masterjam Studio and Fish Farm Record, Sarawak, Malaysia
 Final released by Panggau Buluh Pengerindu Records, Sarawak, Malaysia
 Engineered by Norman Ading
 Videography: Harry Frederick

Awards

References

Masterpiece (band) albums
2009 debut albums